The 2022-23 Championnat National 3 is the sixth season of the fifth tier in the French football league system in its current format. The competition is contested by 168 clubs split geographically across 12 groups of 14 teams. The teams include amateur clubs (although a few are semi-professional) and the reserve teams of professional clubs. The competition starts on 28 August 2022 and is scheduled to end on 4 June 2023.

Teams
On 13 July 2022, the FFF ratified the constitution of the competition, and published the groups, although there were still some issues to be resolved at the time of publishing.

Changes from 2021 to 2022 season were as follows:

Teams joining the division
 Plabennec, Vitré, Schiltigheim, Lens (res), Entente SSG, Rumilly-Vallières, Marseille (res), Montpellier (res), Colomiers and Mont-de-Marsan finished in the relegation positions in 2021–22 Championnat National 2.
 Béziers were relegated from the Championnat National 2 by the Direction Nationale du Contrôle de Gestion for financial mismanagement.
 36 teams gained promotion from the various Régional 1 leagues.

Teams leaving the division
 Stade Bordelais, Saumur, Vierzon, Furiani-Agliani, Racing Besançon, Colmar, Alès, Wasquehal, Évreux, Rennes (res), Racing Club and Thonon Évian finished in the promotion places in 2021–22 Championnat National 3
 Bressuire, Cognac, Tartas, La Châtaigneraie, Sautron, Déols, Amilly, Istres, Athlético Marseille, Marseille Endoume, Saint-Jean Beaulieu, Mandelieu, Paron, Valdahon-Vercel, Saint-Louis Neuweg, Amnéville, Blagnac, Nîmes (res), Muret, Fabrègues, Saint-Omer, Boulogne (res), Le Touquet, Romilly, Bayeux, Stade Pontivyen, Plouzané, Guipry Messac, Trégunc, Créteil (res), Mantes, Meaux Academy, Velay, Aurillac and Moulins finished in the relegation zones and were relegated to Régional 1 for the 2022–23 season.
 Mulhouse were relegated by the DNCG for financial reasons and subsequently entered receivership. 
Narbonne were relegated by the Occitanie league after receiving a points deduction for not fielding junior teams in competitions as required by the regulations..

Other changes
 The merger of Marignane Gignac F.C. and Côte Bleue meant the second team of the new club, Marignane GCB (res), took the place of Côte Bleue in group D.

Promotion and relegation
If eligible, the top team in each group is promoted to Championnat National 2. If a team finishing top of the group is ineligible, or declines promotion, the next eligible team in that group is promoted.

This season, five teams will be relegated from each group to their respective top regional league, subject to reprieves, as a result of the restructuring of the French leagues. Extra teams are relegated from a group if more than one team is relegated to that group from Championnat National 2. In the case that no teams are relegated to a group from Championnat National 2, one less team is relegated from that group to the regional league.

Reserve teams whose training centres are categorised as category 2B or lower cannot be promoted to Championnat National 2 by the rules of the competition.

League tables

Group A: Nouvelle-Aquitaine

Group B: Pays de la Loire

Group C:  Centre-Val de Loire

Group D: Provence-Alpes-Côte d'Azur-Corsica

Group E: Bourgogne-Franche-Comté

Group F: Grand Est

Group H: Occitanie

Group I: Hauts-de-France

Group J: Normandy

Group K: Brittany

Group L: Île-de-France

Group M: Auvergne-Rhône-Alpes

References 

2022
5
Fra